Anna S (styled ANNA☆S) is a Japanese girl group. Their single "命短し走れよ乙女/くるくるりん" reached the eleventh place on the Oricon Weekly Singles Chart.

Discography

Singles

References

Japanese girl groups